Jade Jones may refer to:

 Jade Jones (singer) (born 1979), singer in the boy band Damage
 Jade Jones (taekwondo) (born 1993), British taekwondo athlete and two-time Olympic gold medallist
 Jade Jones-Hall (born 1996), British Paralympic wheelchair racer